Midori Suzuki may refer to:

, Japanese educator
Midori Suzuki (artist) (born 1947), Japanese artist living and working in Mexico
, Japanese soprano